Weißbach is a municipality in the district Saale-Holzland, in Thuringia, Germany. The name of the location was vouched first about 1400, according to other sources in 1072. Meat production is dominating in local business.

References

Municipalities in Thuringia
Saale-Holzland-Kreis